EUR is the ISO 4217 currency code for the Euro, the European Union currency.

EUR  may also refer to:

 EUR, Rome, a residential and business district in Rome, Italy
 Eastern Union Railway, a mid-nineteenth century railway company in East Anglia
 Bureau of European and Eurasian Affairs, in the U.S. Department of State
 Erasmus University Rotterdam, in the Netherlands
 Estimated ultimate recovery, or expected ultimate recovery
 EUR.1 movement certificate, for the reduction of import duties (preferential treatment between certain countries)
 EUR-Lex, a service on the official website of the European Union